Mukachevo is an air base in Ukraine located 6 km southwest of Mukachevo.  During the Cold War it served as a small interceptor base. The airfield had a loop taxiway with many parking revetments. The air base has since been moved to Stryi Air Base, leaving the airfield standing abandoned and empty.

The base was home to the 
 92nd Fighter Aviation Regiment between 1951 and 1993.
 486th Fighter Aviation Regiment between 1951 and 1960.

Airfield today
On 27 April 2021 Governor of Zakarpattia Oblast Anatoliy Poloskov, Zakarpattia Oblast Council chairman Oleksiy Petrov, representatives of the State Agency for Infrastructure Projects and the Mukachevo Territorial Community signed a quadripartite Memorandum of Cooperation on the design and construction of a new airport in Zakarpattia Oblast on the territory of Mukachevo. The new airport would replace Uzhhorod International Airport as Zakarpattia's main air link. Its proposed advantages over Uzhhorod will be a more centralized location, as well as its location completely within Ukrainian airspace (current flights to and from Uzhhorod have to cross over into Slovak territory).

See also
 Mukachevo Radar Station

References

Soviet Air Force bases
Soviet Air Defence Force bases
Airports in Ukraine
Ukrainian airbases